The professional snooker world rankings for the top 27 snooker players in the 1980–81 season are listed below.

Players' performances in the previous three World Snooker Championships (1978, 1979 and 1980) contributed to their points total. For each of the three years, the World Champion gained five points, the runner-up received four, losing semi-finalists got three, losing quarter-finalists got two, and losers in the last-16 round received a single point. Ray Reardon, who had not won a major title for two years, retained the number one ranking despite only reaching the quarter-finals of the 1979 and 1980 championships.

References

1980
Rankings 1981
Rankings 1980